William Wells was a medieval abbot of St. Mary's Abbey, York and Bishop of Rochester.

Wells was elected to the abbacy of St. Mary's in 1423, succeeding Thomas Spofford. He resigned in 1436. Wells was nominated as Bishop of Rochester on 19 September 1436 and consecrated on 24 March 1437. He died between 8 February and 25 February 1444.

Citations

References

 

Bishops of Rochester
15th-century English Roman Catholic bishops
1444 deaths
Year of birth unknown
Abbots of St Mary's, York